Barros F.C. is a Honduran football club, based in Cofradía, Honduras that plays in the Honduran Liga Mayor, the third-highest division overall in Honduran football.  Founded in 1993, they were invited to play at the 2015 Honduran Cup where they reached the second round.

References

Football clubs in Honduras
Association football clubs established in 1993
1993 establishments in Honduras